The Bandar Malaysia railway station is a planned railway station and a high-speed rail terminus as part of the Bandar Malaysia project in the Salak Selatan district in southern Kuala Lumpur, Malaysia. 

The station is planned to serve as a gateway to Kuala Lumpur with the proposed Kuala Lumpur–Singapore High Speed Rail from Singapore, as well as a secondary transport hub after KL Sentral, connecting KLIA Transit, KTM Komuter and the MRT Putrajaya Line. It will also primarily serve the southern half of Bandar Malaysia, with the north being served by Bandar Malaysia North. The station will be built at the site of Simpang Airport together with Bandar Malaysia North station and the rest of the Bandar Malaysia development. However, the High Speed Rail projects as well as a proposed station under the MRT Circle Line are cancelled until further notice.

MRT Putrajaya Line station
The planned MRT station was provisionally named Bandar Malaysia Selatan that will serve the Putrajaya Line in the transport hub. While the MRT Putrajaya Line will begin full operations on 16 March 2023, the planned stations at Bandar Malaysia will not be included in the opening, following the cancellation of the Kuala Lumpur-Singapore high speed railway.

The station, along with the adjacent Bandar Malaysia Utara station, are currently mothballed as future infill stations; trains running between Chan Sow Lin and Kuchai will pass through Bandar Malaysia but will not stop here.

References

External links
 Klang Valley Mass Rapid Transit
 MRT Hawk-Eye View
 http://www.bandarmalaysia.my

Rapid transit stations in Kuala Lumpur
Sungai Buloh-Serdang-Putrajaya Line